Originally called the High Bridge, the Hi-Line Bridge is a historic railroad bridge located over the Sheyenne River in Valley City, North Dakota. Construction work began on July 5, 1906 and it was ready for service on May 8, 1908. At the time it was the longest bridge for its height in the world. It currently remains one of the longest and highest single track railroad viaducts in the United States, and was designated as a National Historic Civil Engineering Landmark by the American Society of Civil Engineers in 2005.

The Northern Pacific Railroad designed and built the bridge to avoid the steep grades into and out of the Sheyenne River valley. At one time, this was a main link in the railroad's coast-to-coast system and was important during both World Wars. To prevent sabotage during the wars, it was guarded by soldiers. The bridge is still used today by freight trains in the BNSF Railway system.

The 61 spans of the bridge are supported on 30 steel towers, each of which is 45 feet long at the top.  The distance between towers at their tops is either 60, 75, or, for three of the spans, 101 feet.  Two of these long spans are above the Sheyenne River and the third crosses over tracks of the former Soo Line Railroad, now part of the Canadian Pacific Railroad.  Each of the steel towers is supported on four concrete foundation piers measuring 6 feet square at their tops, and expanding to 14 to 18 feet square at their bases, depending on subsurface conditions.  Approximately one million rivets were used in construction of the bridge.

References

Railroad bridges in North Dakota
Buildings and structures in Barnes County, North Dakota
Bridges completed in 1908
Northern Pacific Railway
Historic Civil Engineering Landmarks
1908 establishments in North Dakota
Viaducts in the United States
Steel bridges in the United States
BNSF Railway bridges